Micaela Esdra (born Micaela Carmosino; January 29, 1952) is an Italian actress and voice actress.

Biography
Esdra began her career in the mid-1960s attending Rina Morelli's acting school and when she was very young, was directed on stage by Giorgio Strehler, Luchino Visconti, and Luca Ronconi.

As a film actress, she starred in several musicarellis and Horror films, including Mario Bava's Kill, Baby, Kill. Esdra has been also very active on TV and in film dubbing: during the 1990s, she became the official dubber of Winona Ryder and Kim Basinger.

Personal life
In 1988, Esdra married stage director Walter Pagliaro.

Partial filmography
 Made in Italy (1965)
 Highest Pressure (1965)
 Kill, Baby, Kill (1966)
 VIP my Brother Superman (1968)
 A Black Ribbon for Deborah (1974)

Dubbed actresses
 Kim Basinger in My Stepmother Is an Alien, L.A. Confidential, The Burning Plain, Grudge Match and Third Person
 Jane Birkin in Je t'aime moi non plus
 Helena Bonham Carter in Fight Club
 Sandra Bullock in Demolition Man
 Edwige Fenech in The Schoolteacher Goes to Boys' High
 Carrie Fisher in The Blues Brothers
 Melanie Griffith in Lolita
 Daryl Hannah in Blade Runner, Legal Eagles and Roxanne
 Goldie Hawn in Shampoo
 Olivia Hussey in Death on the Nile
 Ashley Judd in Heat
 Jessica Lange in Big Fish
 Winona Ryder in Bram Stoker's Dracula, The Age of Innocence, Little Women, Reality Bites, How to Make an American Quilt, Girl, Interrupted and The Informers
 Kristin Scott Thomas in Random Hearts
 Cybill Shepherd in Taxi Driver
 Tilda Swinton in The Curious Case of Benjamin Button
 Debra Winger in Thank God It's Friday

References

External links

1952 births
Living people
Actresses from Rome
Italian film actresses
Italian voice actresses
Italian stage actresses
Italian child actresses
20th-century Italian actresses
21st-century Italian actresses